Mister Atom is a fictional comic book supervillain, a radioactive robot who is regularly seen as an enemy of Captain Marvel. The character first appeared in Captain Marvel Adventures #78 in November 1947. Along with other members of Captain Marvel's rogues' gallery, Mister Atom was recruited by Mister Mind to be part of the second Monster Society of Evil in 1973.

Publication history
Mister Atom first appeared in Captain Marvel Adventures #78 and was created by Otto Binder and C. C. Beck.

Fictional character biography

Golden Age and Pre-Crisis version 
Mister Atom was created by Dr. Charles Langley in a story in Captain Marvel Adventures #78. His body was constructed first, and then Langley charged the robot with radioactive energy. The spark that gave the robot life also ended the life of his creator. Super-charged with a nuclear reactor and armed with a deadly mind, Mister Atom went on a wave of destruction believing he should rule the world and killed several people in Washington, before being challenged to a fight to the finish by Captain Marvel as he tried to attack the UN Building. He was stopped (barely) by Captain Marvel. Mr. Atom was imprisoned in an underground, lead-lined cell, as no other prison could contain his power, but he threatens to break out one day. Later he was freed by aliens called the Comet Men who hoped to employ his power in the conquest of Earth, though they told him he would rule Earth, and told him to destroy Fawcett City to show his power. But they fell to fighting among themselves when Mr Atom realized they planned to destroy him and they were all apparently destroyed in a giant explosion. However, the blast had actually thrown Mr. Atom forward in time, to 2053, a world where almost everything was run by atomic power, which Mr Atom found out from an inhabitant, and he decided it would be the perfect conquest for him. Captain Marvel travelled to this future after being told by Shazam of the danger which threatened it and battled Atom again, who forced Marvel off by threatening to cause the destruction of the world using the machinery. By now the world officials had decided to give in to Mr Atom and sent a delegation. Once again he was apparently destroyed, this time in an atomic furnace when the engines were turned on after Marvel disguised himself as part of the delegation to block Mister Atom from the machinery.

Mister Atom was re-introduced in 1976, by which time DC Comics had purchased the rights to use the Captain Marvel characters; Captain Marvel's enemy King Kull used his advanced scientific acumen to bring Atom back to the 20th century and employed his help battling Shazam's Squadron of Justice. Atom's first appearance in a DC comic was in Justice League of America #137, a crossover issue depicting Captain Marvel's first meeting with Superman. With Brainiac of Earth-One projecting a force field around him a much larger Mr Atom attempts to wreck a futuristic city on Earth-One called Tomorrow. Destroying the city meant the three super-speedsters had to repair it, which was causing increased rotation of the Earth. Atom easily withstood the efforts of Green Lantern of Earth-Two, Green Lantern of Earth-One, Flash of Earth-Two, Flash of Earth-One, the god Mercury, and Ibis the Invincible to subdue him, even when Brainiac's forcefield around him was turned off and Brainiac had been defeated, but when he tried to use Ibis's Ibistick to send Ibis to a faraway star, having stunned Ibis from an energy blast, he found the stick had a failsafe that caused any commands that would harm Ibis to backfire on the user, and Atom was the one propelled far into space.

Again Atom was brought back to Earth, this time by Mister Mind, who employed him to attach his head to an atomic racecar and challenge Captain Marvel to an auto race in Indianapolis with the threat that he'd level the city with an atomic blast. When Captain Marvel won the race using a Shazam lightning-powered car, and destroyed Atom's car, Atom re-attached his head to his body and attacked Marvel, who hit him hard enough to achieve escape velocity and send Mister Atom into orbit around the sun. Mr Mind was meanwhile captured by Uncle Marvel using a Geiger counter. Captain Marvel then threw the racer into the Sun. Again Mister Mind retrieved Atom with help from the Evil God of Magic Oggar and enlisted him as a member of his Monster Society of Evil. During the Society's assault on the Rock of Eternity, Mr. Atom was shoved off the rock into another universe where life never developed, and he could do no harm.

Post-Crisis version 
Two decades later, Atom was revamped by Jerry Ordway and re-introduced in The Power of Shazam! #23; Mister Atom's modern origin was roughly the same as his Golden Age origin. His appearance was modified, however: the humanoid cyborg design of the original gave way to a more mechanical giant robot look. In his new origin story, Atom, at first not a villain, was told by Dr. Langley before he died to find a suitable woman to take care of him. Mister Atom interpreted Mary Marvel as a suitable woman and kidnapped her, until Captain Marvel found Dr. Langley's assistant to watch over the robot.

In Power of Shazam! #27, Mister Atom was controlled by Mister Mind into creating a nuclear explosion that destroyed the city of Fairview, home to the Marvels, killing thousands.

In Infinite Crisis, Mister Atom became a member of the Secret Society of Super Villains, but was seemingly destroyed by the Golden Age Superman, Kal-L. He didn't stay down for long.

In "52", Captain Marvel mentioned that Mister Atom attacked the Rock of Eternity, only to fail. It is later revealed that Mister Atom is one of the villains who helped Prometheus plant explosive devices in various cities across the U.S., which leads to Mister Atom and several other villains making an attempt to flee the country. Before they can cross the border, the group is attacked by the Justice League, and Mister Atom is defeated and captured by Starman and Congorilla.

In "DC Rebirth", Mister Atom came from the Gamelands and is a member of the Monster Society of Evil. He was among its members imprisoned in the Dungeon of Eternity within the Monsterlands until Mister Mind instructed Doctor Sivana on how to free them. As Shazam fights a Mister Mind-possessed C.C. Batson, Pedro ends in a strength battle with Mister Atom where he states to Pedro that he'll win this game. When Pedro asks what game he's talking about, Mister Atom calls it "Man vs. Machine". While still pinning Pedro down, Mister Atom watches the skies when Mister Mind has Shazam read the spell from the Book of Champions that unites the Seven Magiclands. When Shazam defeats Mister Mind, the resulting magical energy knocked out Mister Atom and the rest of the Monster Society of Evil. The Monster Society of Evil was mentioned to have been remanded to Rock Falls Penitentiary where the Shazam Family built a special section to contain magical threats.

Powers and abilities
Mister Atom has upper-level immense strength and durability. He can fly at subsonic speeds, fire nuclear blasts from his hands, and render radioactive materials inert. Due to his artificial intelligence,  he possesses a gifted mind.

Other versions
Mister Atom appeared in an issue of the Justice League Unlimited comic book, where Doctor Sivana was trying to rebuild him with the help of a local gang. Atom and Sivana were eventually defeated by the Justice League, particularly Vibe. The character also appeared several times in the all-ages comic series Billy Batson and the Magic of Shazam!.

In other media
 Mister Atom appeared in an episode of The Kid Super Power Hour with Shazam!.
 Mister Atom appears in the Batman: The Brave and the Bold episode "The Malicious Mr. Mind", voiced by Dee Bradley Baker. He is seen as a member of the Monster Society of Evil where they battle the Marvel Family and Batman.

References

External links
Mr. Atom at Comic Vine

Comics characters introduced in 1947
DC Comics robots
Robot supervillains
DC Comics supervillains
DC Comics male supervillains
Fawcett Comics supervillains
Golden Age supervillains
Fictional characters with nuclear or radiation abilities
Fictional characters with superhuman durability or invulnerability
DC Comics characters with superhuman strength
Characters created by Otto Binder
Characters created by C. C. Beck
Captain Marvel (DC Comics)